John Oluseun Dabiri is a Nigerian-American aeronautics engineer and the Centennial Chair Professor at the California Institute of Technology (Caltech), with appointments in the Graduate Aerospace Laboratories (GALCIT) and Mechanical Engineering. His research focuses on unsteady fluid mechanics and flow physics, with particular emphasis on topics relevant to biology, energy, and the environment.  He is best known for his research of the hydrodynamics of jellyfish propulsion and the design of a vertical-axis wind farm adapted from schooling fish. He is the director of the Biological Propulsion Laboratory, which examines fluid transport with applications in aquatic locomotion, fluid dynamic energy conversion, and cardiac flows, as well as applying theoretical methods in fluid dynamics and concepts of optimal vortex formation.

In 2010, Dabiri was awarded a MacArthur Fellowship for his theoretical engineering work. He established the Caltech Field Laboratory for Optimized Wind Energy (FLOWE) in 2011, a wind farm which investigates the energy exchange in an array of vertical-axis wind turbines. His honors include a Young Investigator Award from the Office of Naval Research, a Presidential Early Career Award for Scientists and Engineers (PECASE), and being named as one of Popular Science magazine's "Brilliant 10" scientists in 2008. Bloomberg Businessweek magazine listed him among its 2012 Technology Innovators. Since 2021, he has been a member of the President’s Council of Advisors on Science and Technology (PCAST).

Early life and education
Dabiri's parents are Nigerian immigrants, who settled in Toledo, Ohio, in 1975. Dabiri's father was a mechanical engineer who taught math at a community college. His mother, a computer scientist, raised three children and started a software development company. It was watching his father, who would occasionally do engineering work on the side, that encouraged Dabiri's love of engineering.

Educated at a small Baptist high school, where he graduated first in his class in 1997, Dabiri was accepted by Princeton. He was primarily interested in rockets and jets, and spent two summers doing research that included work on helicopter design. The summer after his junior year, he accepted a Summer Undergraduate Research Fellowship (SURF) in Aeronautics at Caltech, rejecting an internship offer from Ford at the urging of a professor. The summer project on the vortices created by a swimming jellyfish enticed him to the growing field of biomechanics.

Dabiri graduated summa cum laude with a B.S.E. in mechanical and aerospace engineering from Princeton University in 2001 after completing a 66-page-long senior thesis, titled "An Investigation of Small-Scale Rotor Blade Aerodynamic Phenomena Using Particle Image Velocimetry and Computational Models", under the supervision of Frederick L. Dryer. Dabiri then returned to Caltech for graduate studies. He was a finalist for both the Rhodes Scholarship and the Marshall Scholarship. He has been awarded NSF research grants eight times in five different fields.

Research 
Jellyfish tend to be very efficient when they swim, which means that on a given amount of energy they can go farther than many other animals can. As one of the simplest multicellular organisms, jellyfish (medusae) contract cells to generate jet forces. By mathematically analyzing the fluid vortex rings that form as a result of the contraction, Dabiri was able to model the formation of optimal vortex rings. Moreover, Dabiri and his colleagues experimentally confirmed that such propulsion becomes "a more efficient means of locomotion as animals grow larger", because the relative impact of viscosity on propulsion decreases with greater size.

To further in situ digital particle image velocimetry measurements of propulsion in aquatic animals, Dabiri and his student K. Katija designed and patented a device which very accurately takes measurements that are computed into the kinetic energy due to swimming. Divers use a laser and optics system that illuminates the flow field. The technique allows for refinement and testing of previous models for vortex formation. The research has "profound implications not only for understanding the evolution and biophysics of locomotion in jellyfish and other aquatic animals, but also for a host of distantly related questions and applications in fluid dynamics, from blood flow in the human heart to the design of wind power generators."

The wind energy industry is scaling to larger and larger blades, which harvest more energy. However, Dabiri believes that problems associated with large turbines—design difficulties, building costs, increasing areal needs (turbines are sometimes erected a mile apart to ensure good wind flow), eyesore complaints and accidental bird/bat fatalities—can be avoided through innovation. His FLOWE center, with 24 close vertical axis turbines, is his step towards more economical harvesting of wind energy. Noting that there is constructive interference in the hydrodynamic wakes of schooling fish, Dabiri suggested that extracting energy from flow vortices could aid more than locomotion. His models of the energy extraction mechanism are applicable to the design and evaluation of unsteady aero- and hydrodynamic energy conversion systems, like wind farms. Design of an array of vertical axis turbines led to about an order of magnitude increase in power output per area. Dabiri partnered with Windspire Energy for use of three of 24 turbines that stand approximately 30 feet tall and 4 feet wide. He started a company, Scalable Wind Solutions, to commercialize the software used to optimally place the wind turbines. This has also led to the U.S. Navy funding development of an underwater craft that propels on these concepts, using up to 30% less energy than formerly.

Reverse engineering is Dabiri's newest research focus. In July 2012, a team composed of Caltech and Harvard students and professors published a paper that outlined a tissue engineering method for building a jellyfish out of rat heart muscle cells and a silicon polymer. On a basic level, the function of a jellyfish - using a muscle to pump a fluid - "is similar to that of a human heart, which makes the animal a good biological system to analyze for use in tissue engineering." The next step this research will take is towards a self-sustaining prototype - one that can gather food and activate muscular contractions internally.

Teaching 
Dabiri was offered a tenured position at Caltech at the age of 29. He gave the 2010 Convocation Address at Caltech. In 2014, he was appointed the undergraduate Dean at Caltech and he was elected as a Fellow of the American Chemical Society.
He was named Professor of the Month at Caltech in February 2012. He served as Chair of the Faculty Board and as Dean of Students during his 10 years in the Caltech Faculty. At the research institute, he has taught several classes, including a graduate class on propulsion, a biomechanics course, a lab class on experimental methods in aeronautics and applied physics, and the introduction fluid mechanics course for which he was highly recommended by students. In 2015 he became a professor at Stanford University.

He is interested in motivating kids considering STEM fields. As recounted in his NPR interview, 
Having two parents there who encouraged me and in some cases forced me to study and to really take academics seriously, was very important at an early stage. And then going through school, the role of my teachers was always so important. I remember my fourth grade teacher ... [she] made me believe that I was smart and so I took that and sort of owned that and tried to live up to the expectations that she had placed on me, even as a fourth grader. And so we really want to grab hold of the imagination of the first graders and the second graders at a very early stage, and get them excited about becoming scientists, as excited as they are about becoming a fire fighter or the next rap star.
He is also involved in his church's mentoring program, The Faith Foundation.

References

Notable publications

External links
Dabiri home page
Publications

American aerospace engineers
American bioengineers
American biophysicists
American people of Nigerian descent
American people of Yoruba descent
Yoruba people
Nigerian engineers
California Institute of Technology alumni
California Institute of Technology faculty
Living people
MacArthur Fellows
People from Toledo, Ohio
Princeton University School of Engineering and Applied Science alumni
Nigerian inventors
21st-century American engineers
Stanford University School of Engineering faculty
Fellows of the American Chemical Society
21st-century American inventors
Year of birth missing (living people)